John Michael Moten (born 8 December 1933)  is an Australian aeronautical engineer. From 1988 to 1992, he was the Director-General of Security, the head of the Australian Security Intelligence Organisation (ASIO). He was the son of Brigadier Murray Moten, a senior Australian Army officer.

Moten was not a career intelligence officer. He had worked at the Department of Defence, where he was Deputy Secretary of the Strategic and Intelligence Section when he accepted the position of ASIO's Director-General. He retired in January 1992, three years into his five-year term. The reasons for his early retirement were never given.

References

1933 births
Living people
Directors-General of Security
Australian aerospace engineers
University of Adelaide alumni
University of Sydney alumni
Scientists from Adelaide